Gerard Francis Martin MP (born 28 May 1946), a former Australian politician, was a member of the New South Wales Legislative Assembly representing the electorate of Bathurst between 1999 and 2011 for the Labor Party.

Martin has worked as an administrator in the coal industry for 30 years and is married with two children.  He was a councillor on the Lithgow City Council from 1974 to 1999 and was the longest-serving mayor of Lithgow, for sixteen years. Prior to entering New South Wales politics, he was previously Deputy Chair, Central West Regional Development Board, and is a former Chairman of Blayney Abattior County Council.

In Parliament, he was Government Whip and was a member of both the Standing Committee on Natural Resource Management and the Standing Orders and Procedure Committee.

Martin, a Catholic, expressed his opposition to stem cell research in 2007 by voting against legislation allowing the practice. The bill subsequently passed.

On 19 October 2010, Martin announced his decision to not seek re-election for the seat of Bathurst at the 2011 state election.

References

 

Living people
Members of the New South Wales Legislative Assembly
1946 births
Australian Labor Party members of the Parliament of New South Wales
21st-century Australian politicians